Taqiabad (also Romanized as Taqīābād; also known as Mamnū‘eh) is a village in Pasakuh Rural District, Zavin District, Kalat County, Razavi Khorasan Province, Iran. At the 2006 census, its population was 585, in 133 families.

References 

Populated places in Kalat County